Muhamed Alghoul (born 9 April 1996) is a professional footballer who plays as an attacking midfielder for Egyptian club Wadi Degla.

Born in Croatia, Alghoul is of Palestinian descent through his father; he represented Croatia internationally at youth level in 2015, before switching allegiance to Palestine in 2021.

Early life 
Alghoul was born in Zagreb, Croatia to a Palestinian father from Gaza, and a Croatian mother of Bosniak descent. He has a younger brother, Khalid, who also plays football. Alghoul is Muslim.

Club career
Alghoul started his career with Croatian First League side Lokomotiva, where he made two appearances, before suffering a knee injury. On 5 October 2014, he debuted for Lokomotiva in a 3–0 defeat to Dinamo Zagreb. Before the second half of 2015–16, Alghoul signed for Dubrava in the Croatian Third League. 

In 2018, Alghoul signed for Croatian Second League club Hrvatski Dragovoljac, where he was nicknamed the "Palestinian Luka Modrić". Before the second half of 2018–19, Alghoul signed for FC Dietikon in the Swiss fifth division. In 2019, he returned to Dubrava.

In January 2022, Alghoul moved to Romanian Liga I side Academica Clinceni.

International career
Alghoul represented Croatia at under-20 and under-21 levels in 2015.

Eligible to represent Palestine internationally through his father, he was first called up to the national team for the 2021 FIFA Arab Cup.

References

External links
 

1996 births
Living people
Footballers from Zagreb
Croatian people of Palestinian descent
Croatian people of Bosniak descent
Palestinian people of Bosniak descent
Croatian Muslims
Palestinian Muslims
Association football midfielders
Croatian footballers
Croatia youth international footballers
Croatia under-21 international footballers
Palestinian footballers
NK Lokomotiva Zagreb players
NK Dubrava players
NK Vinogradar players
NK Hrvatski Dragovoljac players
FC Dietikon players
LPS HD Clinceni players
Wadi Degla SC players
Croatian Football League players
First Football League (Croatia) players
Second Football League (Croatia) players
Liga I players
Egyptian Second Division players
Croatian expatriate footballers
Croatian expatriate sportspeople in Switzerland
Croatian expatriate sportspeople in Romania
Palestinian expatriate footballers
Palestinian expatriate sportspeople in Switzerland
Palestinian expatriate sportspeople in Romania
Palestinian expatriate sportspeople in Egypt
Expatriate footballers in Switzerland
Expatriate footballers in Romania
Expatriate footballers in Egypt